During the 1992–93 English football season, Tranmere Rovers F.C. competed in the Football League First Division.

Season summary
In the 1992–93 season, Tranmere finished 4th and as a result, this qualified them for the play-offs, however they were beaten 5–4 on aggregate by Swindon Town at the semi-final stage.

Final league table

Results
Tranmere Rovers' score comes first

Legend

Football League First Division

First Division play-offs

FA Cup

League Cup

Anglo-Italian Cup

Squad

References

Tranmere Rovers F.C. seasons
Tranmere Rovers